The Hörner Group is a mountain range within the Allgäu Alps, up to , near Fischen im Allgäu in the county of Oberallgäu, in the German state of Bavaria. It is part of the Nagelfluhkette Nature Park.

Geography

Location 
The Hörner Group is in the western part of the Allgäu Alps, west of the Iller valley. To the northeast is Sonthofen, to the east, Fischen im Allgäu, and to the southeast, Oberstdorf. The B 19 runs by to the east, from which the Kreisstraße OA 9 branches off west from Fischen im Allgäu running through Obermaiselstein, via the Riedberg Pass and through Balderschwang to Hittisau in Austria. North of the Hörner Group is the Nagelfluhkette.

Villages 
The settlements of Balderschwang, Bolsterlang, Fischen im Allgäu, Obermaiselstein and Ofterschwang at the foot of the Hörner Group, market themselves as die Hörnerdörfer - the "Hörner villages" represented by a municipal association, the Verwaltungsgemeinschaft Hörnergruppe.

Mountains 
The Hörner Group comprises the following mountains, listed with their height in metres above Normalnull (NN):

Rivers and streams 
Watercourses in and around the Hörner Group are:

Literature 
Überschreitung der Hörner. In: Josef Immler: Geh' mit mir durch die Allgäuer Alpen. Immenstadt 1996, 8th edn., pp. 46–48
 Vom Ofterschwanger zum Bolsterlanger Horn – Höhenwanderung auf dem Panoramaweg. In: Manfred Kittel: Bergwandern mit Kindern im Allgäu. Bruckmann Munich, 1993, pp. 139–140, 
 Kleine Hörnertour und Große Hörnertour. In: Uli und Dieter Seibert: Skitouren Allgäu, Steiger-Skitourenführer, Augsburg 1996, pp. 50–53.

References 

Allgäu Alps
Mountain ranges of the Alps
Protected landscapes in Germany
Oberallgäu